The 2013 Pittsburgh Steelers season was the franchise's 81st season as a professional sports franchise and as a member of the National Football League. It also marked the 14th season under leadership of general manager Kevin Colbert and the seventh under head coach Mike Tomlin.

The Steelers finished the season 8–8, competing with the Baltimore Ravens, Miami Dolphins, and San Diego Chargers for the final AFC playoff spot going into Week 17. The Steelers tried to prevent their worst start since 1968 in Week 4, but the Minnesota Vikings would defeat them 34–27. Baltimore, Miami, and San Diego were all 8–7 going into Week 17, while Pittsburgh was 7–8. This meant that the Steelers had to win and the Ravens, Dolphins, and Chargers all had to lose. Despite a win from the Steelers and losses from the Ravens and Dolphins, the Chargers went on to beat the Kansas City Chiefs 27–24 in overtime, taking the final playoff spot. It was the first season since the 1999 and 2000 seasons that the Steelers would miss back-to-back postseasons.

Staff

Roster

Draft class

Notes
 The Steelers acquired this fourth-round selection in a trade that sent their 2014 third-round selection to the Cleveland Browns.
 Compensatory selection.

Schedule

Preseason

Regular season

Note: Intra-division opponents are in bold text.

Game summaries

Week 1: vs. Tennessee Titans

The Steelers started their 2013 season at home against the Titans.  They scored first when Darius Reynaud down the ball in their own end zone to give the Steelers a safety for a 2–0 lead in the first quarter. In the 2nd quarter, the Titans took the lead as Jackie Battle ran for a 3-yard TD to make the score 7–2 at halftime.  After the break, the Titans went right back to work as Rob Bironas nailed 3 field goals starting off in the 3rd quarter when he nailed one from 26 yards and also 2 in the 4th quarter from 44 and 27 yards out to take leads of 10–2, 13–2, and 16–2 respectively.  The Steelers then tried their luck at a comeback attempt but only came up short as Ben Roethlisberger found Jerricho Cotchery on a 4-yard TD pass for a final score of 16–9 and their 3rd straight 0–1 seasonal start.

Week 2: at Cincinnati Bengals

After a tough season-opening loss, the Steelers traveled to Cincinnati to take on the Bengals.  The Steelers scored first when Shaun Suisham scored a field goal from 44 yards out to make the score 3–0.  The Bengals took the lead as Giovani Bernard ran for a 7-yard touchdown making the score 7–3.  The Bengals scored again in the 2nd quarter as Mike Nugent nailed a 41-yard field goal to make the score 10–3, followed up by Ben Roethlisberger finding Derek Moye on a 1-yard pass to tie the game at 10–10 at halftime. The Bengals retook the lead in the 3rd quarter as Andy Dalton found Bernard on a 27-yard pass to make the score 17–10, which was followed up by Nugent's 25-yard field goal in the 4th quarter for a final score of 20–10.

With their 2nd straight loss to the Bengals, the Steelers started a season 0–2 for the first time since 2002.

Week 3: vs. Chicago Bears

The Steelers returned home after a tough road loss to the Bengals to take on the Bears.  The first quarter was all Bears as they scored 17 unanswered points with Robbie Gould nailing a 47-yard field goal for a 3–0 lead followed up by Matt Forte's 5-yard touchdown run to make the score 10–0 and then Michael Bush's 1-yard touchdown run for a 17–0 lead.  The Steelers managed to get on the board in the 2nd quarter when Shaun Suisham nailed a 27-yard field goal to shorten the lead to 17–3, however the Bears increased their lead when Major Wright returned an interception 38 yards for a touchdown to make the score 24–3. The Steelers came within 14 points at halftime as Ben Roethlisberger found Antonio Brown on a 33-yard touchdown pass to  shorten the score 24–10.  After the break, Gould kicked a 32-yard field goal increasing the Bears' lead to 27–10, but the Steelers answered with 13 straight points starting in the 3rd heading into the 4th quarter as Suisham nailed a 36-yard field goal for a 14-point deficit (27–13) and then a 21-yard pass to Brown from Roethlisberger again, shortening the lead to 7 at 27–20.  In the 4th quarter, the Steelers came within 4 points as Suisham nailed a 44-yard field goal to make the score 27–23.  However, the Bears were able to seal the victory with Jay Cutler's 17-yard pass to Earl Bennett for a score of 34–23 and then Julius Peppers' 42-yard fumble return for a touchdown (with a failed PAT) for a final score of 40–23.

With the loss, the Steelers started a season 0–3 for the first time since 2000. With the Browns winning earlier in the day, the team was left in last in the AFC North.

Week 4: at Minnesota Vikings
NFL International Series

The Steelers traveled to London, England and were considered the visitor team against a Matt Cassel-led Vikings team. The Vikes got off to a fast start as Blair Walsh nailed a 54-yard field goal for a 3–0 lead followed up by Matt Cassel hooking up with Greg Jennings on a 70-yard touchdown pass for a 10–0 lead. The Steelers managed to get on the board later on in the first quarter when rookie RB Le'Veon Bell ran for an 8-yard touchdown to make the game 10–7. The Vikes moved ahead by double digits in the second quarter as Adrian Peterson ran for a 60-yard touchdown for a 17–7 lead. Shaun Suisham got the Steelers within a touchdown by nailing a 26-yard field goal for a 17–10 lead. Walsh moved the Vikes ahead by 10 at halftime by kicking a 37-yard field goal for a 20–10 lead. The Steelers came within 3 as Le'Veon Bell ran for a 1-yard touchdown shortening the lead to 20–17 but the Vikes managed to move ahead 27–17 after Peterson ran for a 7-yard touchdown and then Cassel found Jennings again on a 16-yard touchdown pass to make the lead 34–17. In the 4th quarter, Jerricho Cotchery hooked up with Ben Roethlisberger on a 15-yard touchdown pass for a 34–24 lead, and then tried to rally as Suisham nailed a 28-yard field goal. The Steelers' comeback attempt was ruined again as Roethlisberger was sacked and fumbled the ball with less than a minute left in the game, sealing the victory for the Vikes.
 
With this loss, the Steelers are off to their worst start since the AFL–NFL merger. They had last started 0–4 in 1968, when they started 0–6.  This is also the first time since 2006 in which the team would fall to 4 games below .500 when they started that season 2–6.

Week 6: at New York Jets

Coming off of their bye week, the Steelers traveled to East Rutherford, NJ to take on the Jets.  The Jets scored first in the first quarter when Nick Folk scored a 25-yard field goal for a 3–0 lead for the only score of that period.  The Steelers managed to tie it at first in the 2nd quarter followed by taking the lead with 2 other field goals as Suisham kicked field goals from 46, 33, and 48 yards out for scores of 3–3, 6–3, and 9–3 respectively.  The Jets tried to rally as Folk nailed a 39-yard field goal for a 9–6 score at halftime.  In the 2nd half, it was all Steelers as they pulled away when Ben Roethlisberger found Emmanuel Sanders on a 55-yard touchdown pass for a 16–6 lead in the 3rd quarter which was then followed up by Suisham's 32-yard field goal in the 4th quarter for a final score of 19–6.

With the win, the Steelers improved to 1–4.

Week 7: vs. Baltimore Ravens

After a road win, the Steelers returned home to take on the Ravens.  The Steelers scored first in the first quarter as Ben Roethlisberger hooked up with Heath Miller on a 3-yard touchdown pass making the score 7–0.  Justin Tucker then got the Ravens on the board after nailing a 36-yard field goal shortening the lead to 7–3.  In the 2nd quarter, the Steelers moved ahead by a touchdown as Shaun Suisham nailed a 34-yard field goal to make the score 10–3.  The Ravens moved within 4 as Tucker nailed a 38-yard field goal for a 10–6 game at halftime with the Steelers leading.  After the break, the Steelers went back to work in the 3rd quarter as Suisham kicked a 28-yard field goal for a 13–6 lead.  The Ravens drew within 4 points again in the fourth quarter as Tucker kicked a 32-yard field goal for a 13–9 score.  Again, the Steelers retaliated and moved ahead by 7 points as Suisham kicked a 38-yard field goal for a 16–9 lead.  However, Joe Flacco was able to find Dallas Clark on a 1-yard touchdown pass tying the game at 16–16.  The Steelers managed to drive down the field for the game-winning field goal as Suisham nailed it from 42 yards out for a final score of 19–16 sending the Steelers to a 2–4 start.

Week 8: at Oakland Raiders

After winning at home against the Ravens, the Steelers traveled to Oakland to take on the Raiders. The Raiders got off to a fast start in the 1st quarter when Terrelle Pryor ran for a 93-yard touchdown to take a 7–0 lead. This remains the longest touchdown run by any QB in NFL history. Darren McFadden ran into the end zone for a 7-yard touchdown run to make the score 14–0. The Steelers managed to get on the board in the 2nd quarter when Shaun Suisham nailed a 47-yard field goal for a 14–3 deficit. But the Raiders moved ahead as McFadden ran for another touchdown from 4 yards out for a 21–3 score at halftime. After a scoreless 3rd quarter, the Steelers went back to work in the 4th quarter as Ben Roethlisberger found Emmanuel Sanders on a 9-yard touchdown pass to make the score 21–10 and then Le'Veon Bell ran for a 4-yard touchdown with the successful 2-point conversion to make the final score 21–18 as their comeback attempt again was cut short and the team fell to 2–5. On a positive note, they had won 2 out of their last 3 games coming off their bye week.

Week 9: at New England Patriots

After a tough loss to the Raiders, the Steelers traveled to Foxborough to take on the Patriots. The Patriots scored first when Danny Amendola caught a 34-yard TD pass from Tom Brady to make the score 7–0. In the 2nd quarter, the Patriots increased their lead as Brady found Rob Gronkowski on a 19-yard pass to make the score 14–0. The Steelers finally got on the board when Shaun Suisham kicked a 30-yard field goal to make it 14–3, but the Pats went ahead by 2 touchdowns again as Stephen Gostkowski nailed a field goal from 20 yards out making the score 17–3. Ben Roethlisberger regardless was able to find Antonio Brown for his 200th career TD pass, a 27-yarder to come behind by 7, 17–10. But the Pats pulled away as Stevan Ridley ran for a 1-yard TD to make it 24–10 at halftime. In the 3rd quarter, Roethlisberger found Cotchery again on a 20-yard pass cutting the lead to 24–17 and again on an 8-yard pass tying the game at 24. However, the Patriots pulled away again as Gostkowski kicked a 32-yard field goal to make the score 27–24. They continued to dominate in the 4th quarter scoring a total of 17 straight points as Brady found Aaron Dobson on a 17-yard pass to make the score 34–24 and Ridley again ran for another TD from 5-yards out making the score 41–24. Roethlisberger and Cotchery hooked up again on a 6-yard pass to shorten the lead to 41–31, however the Patriots were able to pull away as Brady found Dobson again on an 81-yard pass to make the score 48–31 and ended it with LeGarrette Blount's 5-yard run making the final score 55–31.

With the loss, the Steelers dropped to 2–6, the team's first such start since 2006. It may also be noted that since 2006 whenever the team has been below .500 in a season, they would eventually finish with 8 wins or more, but at the same time, miss out on the playoffs. Also, the 55 points are the most points ever scored against the Steelers as the Patriots became the first team to score 50+ points against the team since the Bills' victory of 52–34 in 1991.

Week 10: vs. Buffalo Bills

After a tough road loss to the Patriots, the Steelers traveled home to take on the Bills.  The Bills scored first in the first quarter when Dan Carpenter nailed a 20-yard field goal for a 3–0 lead and the only score of the quarter. The Steelers however, responded by doing it big starting off in the 2nd quarter tying the game at 3 when Shaun Suisham nailed a 36-yard field goal. They would increase their lead as Ben Roethlisberger found Jerricho Cotchery on a 5-yard TD pass giving them a 10–3 halftime lead. After the break, the Steelers went back to work as Le'Veon Bell ran for a 4-yard TD increasing their lead to 17–3. They followed up in the 4th quarter with 2 Suisham field goals from 37 and 23 yards out for a lead of 20–3 and then 23–3 respectively. The Bills finally managed to score a TD in the final seconds of the game when EJ Manuel found Chris Gragg on a 2-yard pass, making the final score 23–10, sealing the win for the Steelers, who improved themselves to 3–6.

Week 11: vs. Detroit Lions

After defeating the Bills, the Steelers stayed home to take on the visiting Lions.  They started off scoring in the 1st quarter as Ben Roethlisberger found Antonio Brown on 2 consecutive TD passes from 34 and 47 yards out for leads of 7–0 and then 14–0.  The Lions were able to get on the board as David Akers nailed a 35-yard field goal to make the score 14–3.  The Steelers managed to pull away by 2 touchdowns as Shaun Suisham nailed a 25-yard field goal for a 17–3 lead.  The Lions drew closer as Matthew Stafford found Calvin Johnson on a 79-yard TD pass shortening the lead to 17–10 not long before Suisham nailed a 34-yard field goal to make the score 20–10.  Just then, the Lions managed to take the lead scoring 17 straight points when Stafford found Calvin Johnson again on a 19-yard pass making the score 20–17 and with the Lions taking the lead as Joique Bell ran for a 4-yard TD moving them ahead 24–20 and then finally wrapped things up in the first half as Akers nailed a 19-yard field goal to take a 27–20 lead at halftime.
After the break, the Steelers got back to work as Suisham nailed a 21-yard field goal to shorten the Lions' lead to 27–23.  They took the lead in the 4th quarter as Roethlisberger found Will Johnson on a 1-yard pass making the score 30–27.  After a failed fake field goal attempt by the Lions, the Steelers set the ball up at their own 3-yard line.  Due to a huge penalty against the team, the Steelers were able to move further down the field and seal the win for themselves as Roethlisberger found Jerricho Cotchery on a 20-yard pass for a final score of 37–27.

With the win, the Steelers improved to 4–6.

Week 12: at Cleveland Browns

After a win over the Lions, the Steelers traveled to Cleveland to take on the Browns.  They drew first blood as Shaun Suisham nailed a field goal from 47 yards out to take a 3–0 lead.  The Browns managed to tie the game as Billy Cundiff helped them tie it at 3–3 in the first quarter.  In the 2nd quarter, the Steelers moved back into the lead scoring 24 unanswered points in the process.  Ben Roethlisberger found Antonio Brown on a 41-yard touchdown pass to make the score 10–3 followed by another Suisham field goal this time from 32 yards out to make the score 13–3 at halftime.  In the 3rd quarter, Roethlisberger found Emmanuel Sanders on a 4-yard touchdown pass increasing their lead to 20–3 followed by William Gay who picked off Brandon Weeden and returned it 21 yards for a touchdown making the score 27–3.  The Browns would score a touchdown of their own as Weeden found Josh Gordon on a 1-yard touchdown pass followed by a successful 2-point conversion pass to Davone Bess to make the final score 27–11 as the Steelers improved to 5–6 winning 3 straight and taking their trend to winning 5 out of their last 7.

Week 13: at Baltimore Ravens
Thanksgiving Day game

After a win at Cleveland, the Steelers traveled to Baltimore to take on the Ravens in what would be the Thanksgiving Primetime Game and of course their first game on Thanksgiving Day since 1998.  The Ravens drew first blood as Joe Flacco found Torrey Smith on a 7-yard pass to make the score 7–0 in the first quarter.  In then 2nd quarter, Justin Tucker nailed a 43-yard field goal for a 10–0 halftime lead.  After the break, the Ravens went back to work in the 3rd quarter as Tucker nailed a 34-yard field goal for a 13–0 lead.  The Steelers finally got on the board as
Ben Roethlisberger found Emmanuel Sanders on an 8-yard touchdown pass for a 13–7 score. On the ensuing kick-off, Mike Tomlin was standing just off the field along the Steelers' sideline as Baltimore's Jacoby Jones broke free on the return for a potential game breaking touchdown. Tomlin, with his back to the approaching play, appeared to glance over his shoulder then place his foot briefly onto the field as he jumped out of the way, causing Jones to veer inside where he was tackled. Several Ravens players claimed Tomlin had intentionally interfered with Jones; if officials had agreed, a touchdown could have been awarded to the Ravens based on the palpably unfair act, no penalty was called. A week later the NFL fined Tomlin $100,000. 
The Ravens then pulled away as Tucker kicked yet another field goal putting his team ahead by 9, 16–7.  In the 4th quarter, Tucker kicked yet another field goal this one from 45 yards out for a score of 19–7.  The Steelers managed to draw within 5 points 19–14 when Le'Veon Bell ran for a 1-yard touchdown.  Tucker then kicked a 48-yard field goal to make the score 22–14.  The Steelers started their comeback attempt as Roethlisberger found Jerricho Cotchery on a 1-yard touchdown pass for a 22–20 score.  After this, they tried the 2-point conversion to tie the game and send it into OT, but they would come up short and miss the conversion with 1:03 left in the game.

This dropped the team to 5–7 and 3rd place in the AFC North.  Also they dropped to 2–5 on Thanksgiving.

Week 14: vs. Miami Dolphins

After a tough road loss to the Ravens, the Steelers went home for a game against the Dolphins.  They would score first as Ben Roethlisberger found Emmanuel Sanders on a 5-yard pass for a 7–0 lead.  The Dolphins managed to get on the board as Caleb Sturgis kicked a 30-yard field goal making the score 7–3.  In the 2nd quarter, Charles Clay caught a 6-yard touchdown pass from Ryan Tannehill as the Phins took the lead 10–7 at halftime.  After the break, the Dolphins went right back to work as Daniel Thomas ran for a 4-yard touchdown making the score 17–7.  The Steelers then came within 3 when Roethlisberger found Antonio Brown on a 43-yard touchdown pass making the score 17–14 and would eventually score again when Troy Polamalu picked off Tannehill and returned it 19 yards for a touchdown as they retook the lead 21–17.  The Dolphins however moved back into the lead as Tannehill found Brian Hartline on a 4-yard pass for a 24–21 score.  In the 4th quarter, Roethlisberger found Jerricho Cotchery on a 16-yard touchdown pass as they moved ahead 28–24.  Clay then caught a pass from Tannehill making the score 31–28 as the Dolphins retook the lead.  They would stop scoring after Sturgis kicked a 27-yard field goal for a 34–28 lead.  Under a minute to go in the quarter, the Steelers got the ball back with Roethlisberger throwing to Brown and then Brown running for what seemed to be the game-tying (and eventually game-winning touchdown and PAT), but officials reviewed the play and it was determined that Brown had stepped out of bounds during the run ending the game dropping the team to 5–8.

Week 15: vs. Cincinnati Bengals

The Steelers stayed home for a SNF duel against longtime division rival Bengals.  The first quarter was all Steelers as they scored touchdowns in 3 different ways:  Le'Veon Bell ran for a 1-yard, Antonio Brown caught a 12-yard pass, and then returned a punt 67 yards putting up scores of 7–0, 14–0, and 21–0.  This remains the most points in their franchise history they have scored in the first quarter while it remains the largest number of points the Bengals have allowed in the first quarter alone.  This streak of points stood at 24 straight as Shaun Suisham kicked a 25-yard field goal.  The Bengals finally got on the board as Gio Benard ran for a 1-yard touchdown making the score 24–7.  Suisham then nailed a 45-yard field goal to move his team ahead 27–7 at halftime.  After this, the Steelers went back to work in the 3rd quarter coming away with another field goal from 26 yards out for a 30–7 lead.  The 4th quarter however, was all Bengals as Andy Dalton and Tyler Eifert connected on a 1-yard touchdown pass making the score 30–14 not long before Dalton found Marvin Jones on a 13-yard pass making the score 30–20, but the 2-point conversion failed as the Steelers would eventually win the game with that score as the final sending them to 6–8.  Coupled with losses of the Ravens, Chargers, and Dolphins, the Steelers also remained in the playoff hunt.

Week 16: at Green Bay Packers

After the win at home against the Bengals, the Steelers traveled to take on the Packers in a rematch of Super Bowl XLV.  Coming into this game with a record of 2–5 in road games, the Packers scored first when Matt Flynn found Jarrett Boykin on a 5-yard pass for a 7–0 lead.  The Steelers managed to tie it up late in the first quarter when Ben Roethlisberger found Emmanuel Sanders on a 1-yard pass taking the game to 7–7.  In the 2nd quarter, the Packers retook the lead as Eddie Lacy ran for a 14-yard touchdown making the score 14–7.  This was followed up by the Steelers coming within 4 as Suisham kicked a 31-yard field goal as for a 14–10 score at halftime.  After the break, the Steelers took the lead as Roethlisberger rushed for a touchdown himself from 13 yards out making the score 17–14.  The Packers took the lead back as Lacy ran for a 2-yard touchdown making the score 21–17.  The Steelers then moved back into the lead as Roethlisberger found Matt Spaeth on an 11-yard pass, making the score 24–21, and then Cortez Allen picked off Matt Flynn returning the ball 40 yards for a touchdown, making the score 31–21.  In the 4th quarter, the Packers tried a comeback attempt as Mason Crosby nailed a 22-yard field goal to come within 7, at 31–24.  Eventually, they managed to tie the game when John Kuhn ran for a 1-yard touchdown at 31–31.  The Steelers moved back into the lead as Le'Veon Bell ran for a 1-yard touchdown for a 38–31 lead.  Matt Flynn moved the Packers down the field but his last attempt within the final 3 seconds was incomplete, sealing the win for the Steelers as they improved to 7–8 while finishing 3–5 in road games.

Week 17: vs. Cleveland Browns

The Steelers' final game of the season would be at home against the Browns.  They would draw first blood as Ben Roethlisberger found Jerricho Cotchery on a 9-yard pass for a 7–0 lead.  Le'Veon Bell ran for a touchdown from 5 yards out making the score 14–0 at halftime.  Shaun Suisham would go on to kick 2 field goals in the 3rd and 4th quarters from 30 and 32 yards out making the score 17–0, and 20–0.  Later on in the quarter, the Browns managed to score their only 7 points of the whole game as Jason Campbell found Fozzy Whittaker on a 35-yard pass for a final score of 20–7.

The team finished the season with another 8–8 record and despite losses by the Ravens and Dolphins, the Steelers were eliminated from playoff contention for the second consecutive season after the Chargers defeated the Chiefs. This would be the first time since 1999 and 2000 that the Steelers would fail to make the playoffs in consecutive seasons.

Antonio Brown became the first player in NFL History to record at least five catches and 50 yards in every game.

Standings

Division

Conference

Statistics
Updated December 30, 2013

Team

Passing

Rushing

Receiving

Field Goals

Punting

Punt Returns

Kick Returns

Defense

Interceptions

Transactions
The Steelers have been involved in the following transactions during the 2013 season:

Trades

Free agents acquired

Free agents lost

Claimed via waivers

Player signings

Other

References

External links 

 2013 Pittsburgh Steelers season at Pro Football Reference 
 2013 Pittsburgh Steelers season statistics at jt-sw.com 
 2013 Pittsburgh Steelers season at ESPN

Pittsburgh
Pittsburgh Steelers seasons
2013 in sports in Pennsylvania
2010s in Pittsburgh